Susan Wood (1836–1880) was a notable New Zealand writer. She was born in Great Swan Port, Tasmania, Australia in 1836.

References

1836 births
1880 deaths
New Zealand writers
New Zealand women writers
Australian emigrants to New Zealand
19th-century women writers